Richard Lee Calmus (born January 7, 1944) is a former pitcher in Major League Baseball. He attended Webster High School in Tulsa, Oklahoma, where he was the Tulsa World's Oklahoma basketball player of the year in 1962. He played baseball on the same high school team as fellow future major leaguer Carl Morton and won two state titles.

Signed as a "bonus baby" by the Los Angeles Dodgers (and thus required to stay on the major league roster for his first season), he posted a 3–1 record and 2.66 ERA in 1963 but then developed arm trouble in the minor leagues; later traded to the Chicago Cubs, he never won another game in the majors.

He is the uncle of Rocky Calmus, who played in the NFL after winning the Butkus Award in 2001 as a linebacker for the University of Oklahoma.

References

External links

1944 births
Living people
Albuquerque Dodgers players
Albuquerque Dukes players
Arizona Instructional League Cubs players
Baseball players from California
Baseball players from Oklahoma
Chicago Cubs players
Keokuk Dodgers players
Los Angeles Dodgers players
Major League Baseball pitchers
Midwest Dodgers players
Northeastern State RiverHawks baseball players
San Antonio Missions players
Spokane Indians players
Sportspeople from Tulsa, Oklahoma
Tacoma Cubs players
Webster High School (Tulsa, Oklahoma) alumni